Cannabimovone (CBM) is a phytocannabinoid first isolated from a non-psychoactive strain of Cannabis sativa in 2010, which is thought to be a rearrangement product of cannabidiol. It lacks affinity for cannabinoid receptors, but acts as an agonist at both TRPV1 and PPARγ.

See also
 Cannabichromene
 Cannabicitran
 Cannabicyclol
 Cannabielsoin
 Cannabigerol
 Cannabinodiol
 Cannabitriol
 Delta-6-CBD

References 

Cannabinoids
Ketones
Isopropenyl compounds
Cyclopentanols
Phenols